The Legislative Assembly of the State of São Paulo is the unicameral legislative branch of São Paulo state in Brazil. The building where the legislative assembly is located, right by the main park of the city also houses one of six Poupatempo units in the city.

Presidents 
 Valentim Gentil - 1947 to 1948
 José Milliet Filho - 1948
 Francisco Álvares Florence - 1948
 Lincoln Feliciano da Silva - 1948 to 1949
 Brasílio Augusto Machado de Oliveira Neto - 1949 to 1951
 Diógenes Augusto Ribeiro de Lima - 1951 to 1952
 Asdrúbal Euritysses da Silva - 1952 to 1953
 Victor Maida - 1953 to 1954
 Vicente de Paula Lima - 1954 to 1955
 Vicente Botta - 1955
 André Franco Montoro - 1955 to 1956
 Ruy de Almeida Barbosa - 1956 to 1959
 Guilherme de Oliveira Gomes - 1959
 Francisco Franco - 1959
 Ruy de Mello Junqueira - 1959 to 1960
 Roberto Costa do Abreu Sodré - 1960 to 1963
 Cyro Albuquerque - 1963 to 1965
 Francisco Franco - 1965 to 1967
 Nelson Agostinho de Cápua Pereira - 1967 to 1970
 Orlando Gabriel Zancaner - 1970 to 1971
 Manoel Alexandre Marcondes Machado Filho - 1971
 Jacob Pedro Carolo - 1971 to 1973
 José Salvador Julianelli - 1973 to 1975
 Januário Mantelli Neto - 1975
 Leonel Júlio - 1975 to 1976
 Vicente Botta - 1976 to 1977
 Natal Gale - 1977 to 1979
 Robson Riedel Marinho - 1979 to 1981
 Januário Mantelli Neto - 1981 to 1983
 Néfi Teles - 1983 to 1985
 Luiz Carlos Santos - 1985 to 1987
 Luiz Benedicto Maximo - 1987 to 1989
 Antonio Cleidenir Tonico Ramos - 1989 to 1991
 Carlos Alberto Eugênio Apolinário - 1991 to 1993
 Vitor Sapienza - 1993 to 1995
 José Ricardo Alvarenga Tripoli - 1995 to 1997
 Paulo Setti Kobayashi - 1997 to 1999
 José Carlos Vaz de Lima - 1999
 Vanderlei Macris - 1999 to 2001
 Walter Meyer Feldman - 2001 to 2003
 Juscelino Cardoso de Sá - 2003
 Sidney Estanislay Beraldo - 2003 to 2005
 Rodrigo Garcia - 2005 to 2007
 Vaz de Lima - 2007 to 2009
 Barros Munhoz - 2009 to 2013
 Samuel Moreira - 2013 to 2015
 Fernando Capez - 2015 to 2017
 Cauê Macris - 2017 to 2021
 Carlos Pignatari - 2021 to 2023
 André do Prado - Since 2023

Present composition

Leaderships

Partisan blocs composition

See also
 Museum of Art of the Parliament of São Paulo

Notes

References

External links
  Assembléia Legislativa do Estado de São Paulo - Official website

Politics of São Paulo (state)
Sao Paulo
São Paulo
Government of São Paulo (state)